No. 111 Air-Sea Rescue Flight was a Royal Australian Air Force unit of World War II.

It was formed at Madang in New Guinea on 13 December 1944 and was equipped with Consolidated Catalinas.

The flight's role was to carry out search and rescue operations and provide air-sea rescue support to other aircraft during attacks on Japanese targets. The flight's aircraft also conducted offensive operations and dropped supplies on behalf of the Australian New Guinea Administrative Unit.

Following the end of the war the Flight moved to Port Moresby on 18 March 1946 and was disbanded there on 24 January 1947.

References
 RAAF Historical Section (1995), Units of the Royal Australian Air Force. A Concise History. Australian Government Publishing Service, Canberra.

111
Military units and formations established in 1944
1944 establishments in Australia
Military units and formations disestablished in 1947
1947 disestablishments in Australia